Icy Creek is a locality in Victoria, Australia, located on Mount Baw Baw Road, in the Shire of Baw Baw.

Icy Creek Post Office opened on 1 December 1934 and closed in 1968.

References

Towns in Victoria (Australia)
Shire of Baw Baw